Nebria nana is a species of ground beetle in the Nebriinae subfamily that can be found in Qinghai province of China and Tibet.

References

nana
Beetles described in 1996
Beetles of Asia
Endemic fauna of China